The Purena-class (プレナ) locomotives were a group of steam tank locomotives with 2-6-2 wheel arrangement of used by the Chosen Government Railway (Sentetsu) in Korea. The "Pure" name came from the American naming system for steam locomotives, under which locomotives with 2-6-2 wheel arrangement were called "Prairie".

In all, Sentetsu owned 227 locomotives of all Pure classes, whilst privately owned railways owned another 52; of these 279 locomotives, 169 went to the Korean National Railroad in South Korea and 110 to the Korean State Railway in North Korea.

Description
Locomotives of this design were built for one unidentified private railway company in Korea, the Chosen Government Railway, and the privately owned Gyeongchun Railway in Korea, as well as for the South Manchuria Railway.

Chosen Government Railway プレナ (Purena) class
The プレナ (Purena) class locomotive was designed by the Railway Bureau based on the experiences gained through the design of modifications leading to the Pureshi-class rebuilds, and differed considerably from the imported Pure classes. The first eight were built for a private railway, with Hitachi's Kasato factory and Kawasaki each building four units; these were bought by Sentetsu in 1936 and numbered 341-348. 

The design was then modified to include a superheater, but the resulting design retained the "Purena" classification; the two subclasses were thenceforward referred to as the "Original Purena" and "Bureau Purena" (局プリナ) classes. The first six Bureau Purena locomotives were built for Sentetsu in 1931 by the Gyeongseong Works; these were numbered 321 through 326. The 14 locomotives of both Purena subtypes were lumped together in Sentetsu's general renumbering of 1938, with 341–348 becoming プレナ1 through プレナ8, and 321–326 becoming プレナ9 through プレナ14. In 1938 four more were built by Nippon Sharyō and fourteen more were built at Gyeongseong. In 1939 and 1941, a total of nine were built by Kawasaki and Hitachi Kasato for the Gyeongchun Railway; these were assembled in Korea at Sentetsu's Busan shops and numbered プレナ85 through プレナ93.

South Manchuria Railway プレサ (Puresa) class
Nineteen locomotives of the Sentetsu Purena design were built for the South Manchuria Railway (Mantetsu) in Japan in 1935. Although under the Mantetsu classification system tank locomotives were generally given the "Dabu" (ダブ, from "double-ender") classification, Mantetsu instead designated these as プレサ (Puresa) class; eight were assigned to Mantetsu's Rajin depot for use on the North Chosen Line, whilst the other ten were assigned to depots in Manchukuo.

Postwar
After the end of the Pacific War, the locomotives owned by Sentetsu and the Gyeongchun Railway were divided between North and South Korea, whilst those belonging to Mantetsu were divided between North Korea and China.

Korean National Railroad 푸러7 (Pureo7) class
Many Purena class locomotives ended up with the Korean National Railroad after Liberation, which designated them 푸러7 (Pureo7) class; at least 15 are known to have been operated by the KNR.

Korean State Railway 부러치 (Purŏch'i) class/1700 series
The Sentetsu Purena class locomotives that remained in the North after the partition of Korea were operated by the Korean State Railway, designating them 부러치 (Purŏch'i) class, and later renumbering them into the 1700 series around the early 1970s. Three examples, numbers 1709, 1718, and 1720, were operational  at the steelworks in Ch'ŏngjin as of November 2019, being used for tourist events.

Korean State Railway 부러서 (Purŏsŏ) class/1300 series
The nine Puresa-class locomotives that Mantetsu had assigned to its Rajin depot were taken over by the Korean State Railway after the war. They were initially designated 부러서 (Purŏsŏ) class - together with the Puresa-class engines inherited from Sentetsu - and were retained in use mostly around Rajin; around the early 1970s, they were renumbered into the 1300 series, though at least one's number omitted the initial '1'. At least two have been seen operational in the 21st century; one, 1304, was seen in 2001 doing shunting work at Ch'ŏngjin, while the other, 1319, is still operational as of October 2015, kept in pristine condition for use with tourist and railfan trains.

The one unit known to have omitted the initial '1', number 307, was inspected by Kim Jong-il as a child at Rajin Station on 6 September 1954. This locomotive has also been depicted on a commemorative stamp issued by the DPRK postal service.

China Railways PL3 class
The ten Puresa-class engines that were used by Mantetsu in Manchukuo were taken over first by the joint Chinese-Soviet "Chinese Changchun Railway" (Chinese: 中國長春鐵路, Zhōngguó Chǎngchūn Tiělù; Russian: Кита́йская Чанчу́ньская желе́зная доро́га, Kitayskaya Chanchun'skaya Zheleznaya doroga), which took over Mantetsu operations within China in 1945. In 1952, the Chinese Changchun Railway was returned to China, and they were taken over by the China Railway as class ㄆㄌ3. In 1959, they were designated class PL3, numbered 51–60.

Construction

References

Locomotives of Korea
Locomotives of North Korea
Locomotives of South Korea
Steam locomotives of China
Standard gauge locomotives of China
Rolling stock of Manchukuo
2-6-2 locomotives
Gyeongseong Works locomotives
Hitachi locomotives
Kawasaki locomotives
Kisha Seizo locomotives
Nippon Sharyo locomotives